Tyrosine-protein kinase transmembrane receptor ROR1, also known as neurotrophic tyrosine kinase, receptor-related 1 (NTRKR1), is an enzyme that in humans is encoded by the ROR1 gene.  ROR1 is a member of the receptor tyrosine kinase-like orphan receptor (ROR) family.

Function 

The protein encoded by this gene is a receptor tyrosine kinase that modulates neurite growth in the central nervous system. It is a type I membrane protein and belongs to the ROR subfamily of cell surface receptors. ROR1 is currently under investigation for its role in the metastasis of cancer cells.

ROR1 has recently been shown to be expressed on ovarian cancer stem cell, on which it seems to play a functional role in promoting migration/invasion or spheroid formation in vitro and tumor engraftment in immune-deficient mice. Treatment with a humanized mAb specific for ROR1 (UC-961) could inhibit the capacity of ovarian cancer cells to migrate, form spheroids, or engraft immune-deficient mice. Moreover, such treatment inhibited the growth of tumor xenografts, which in turn had a reduced capacity to engraft immune-deficient mice and were relatively depleted of cells with features of CSC, suggesting that treatment with UC-961 could impair CSC renewal. Collectively, these studies indicate that ovarian CSCs express ROR1, which may be targeted for anti-CSC therapy.

Zilovertamab vedotin (ZV), an antibody–drug conjugate comprising a monoclonal antibody recognizing extracellular ROR1, a cleavable linker and monomethyl auristatin E has entered clinical trials for the treatment of lymphoid malignancies.

References

Further reading 

 
 
 
 
 
 
 
 
 
 

Tyrosine kinase receptors